Luke Egan (born 24 January 1970) is an Australian professional surfer who competed on the Association of Surfing Professionals Men's World Tour.

Career Victories

Personal life
Egan has three children.

References

External links

1970 births
Living people
Sportspeople from Newcastle, New South Wales
Australian surfers
Surfboard shapers
World Surf League surfers